Freenet AG (formerly freenet.de AG) is a German telecommunications and web content provider. In 2004, its EBITDA was 471.5 million euro. In 2007, Freenet.de merged with Mobilcom, a deal which took around two years to complete, and the resulting company changed its name to Freenet AG. In July 2008 Freenet AG acquired debitel AG, another German telecommunications company.

The company was formerly active in the provision of broadband Internet services, but sold this unit to United Internet for €123 million in 2009. At the end of February 2022, it was announced that the Mobilcom-Debitel brand would be discontinued in July of the same year in favor of freenet. The changeover will take place on July 13, and the company has additionally been renamed freenet DLS.

References

External links 
 

Companies based in Schleswig-Holstein
Internet service providers of Germany
German companies established in 2007
German brands
Companies in the TecDAX
Companies in the MDAX